Los Pitchers is the collaborative studio album by Puerto Rican reggaeton artist Miguelito & Gold2. It was released on August 4, 2009.

Track list

References
 [www.cduniverse.com/productinfo.asp?pid=7932889] [www.amazon.com/Los-Pitchers/dp/B002C91DNA]

Miguelito (singer) albums
2009 albums